Vega is a star in the constellation Lyra.

Vega or VEGA may also refer to:

Aerospace
 Vega (crater), a lunar crater
 Vega (rocket), an expendable launch system in use by Arianespace, jointly developed by the Italian Space Agency and the European Space Agency
 Lockheed Vega, an American monoplane produced 1927–1931
 Percival Vega Gull, a British aircraft produced 1935–1939
 Slingsby Vega, a British glider
 Stern ST 87 Vega, a French homebuilt aircraft design
 Vega Aircraft Corporation, a subsidiary of Lockheed
 Vega program, a series of space missions
 VEGA Space GmbH, a European aerospace company that merged into Telespazio VEGA Deutschland
 Vega Space UK, a UK-based space company
 Walter Vega, a Czechoslovak radial aeroengine

Places
 Vega (Aller), a parish of the municipality of Aller, Asturias, Spain
 Vega (island in Norway), an island in Nordland county, Norway
 Vega Archipelago, Norway
 Vega, Alberta, Canada
 Vega, Georgia, United States
 Vega, Gijón, a parish of the municipality of Gijón, Asturias, Spain
Vega de Granada, a comarca in Andalusia, Spain 
 Vega, Haninge, Sweden
 Vega Station, on Stockholm commuter rail
 Vega, Norway, a municipality in Norway
 Vega, Ohio, United States
 Vega, Texas, United States
 Vega Island, an island in Antarctica
 La Vega, Dominican Republic

Arts, entertainment,  and media

Fiction

Characters
 Vega (Street Fighter), a Street Fighter character, named Balrog in Japan
 M. Bison,  the main antagonist of the Street Fighter universe, known as Vega in Japan
 King Vega, a Ufo Robot Grendizer character
 Vega Obscura, a Zoids: New Century Zero character
 Vega, a Gear Fighter Dendoh character
 General Vega, a characters from the video game Command & Conquer: Tiberian Sun
 James Vega, a character in the Mass Effect series
 Tori Vega and Trina Vega, characters in the Nickelodeon sitcom Victorious
 Vic and Vincent Vega, brothers from the Quentin Tarantino films Pulp Fiction and Reservoir Dogs
 VEGA, a sentient artificial intelligence that runs the UAC Mars facility in Doom and also runs the Fortress of Doom in Doom Eternal

Music
 Vega Company, a musical instruments manufacturer
 Vega (band), a Turkish alternative rock band founded in 1996
 VEGA (UK rock band), a melodic rock/AOR band from the United Kingdom
 Vega, Copenhagen, a concert hall in Copenhagen
 Vega (radio network), a now-defunct Australian network now known as smoothfm
 Yle Vega,  a Finnish radio channel broadcasting in Swedish
 Vega (album), an album by Janvs
 "Vega", an outro song by Breaking Benjamin from the 2018 album Ember
 Vega, a 2018 album by Danheim

Organizations and enterprises
 Vega (company), a brand of vegan products
 Facel Vega, a French car manufacturer in operation 1954–1964
 Vega Company, a musical instrument manufacturer
 Vega Group, a Russian special forces unit
 Vega Industries, a New Zealand marine light manufacturer
 Vega Radio Engineering Corporation, a Russian company specializing in military surveillance radio systems
 Vega Sicilia, Spanish winery in the Ribera del Duero
 Vega Telecommunications Group, a Ukrainian telecommunications provider
 Volunteers for Economic Growth Alliance, international development group
 Smooth 95.3, radio station in Sydney, Australia formerly named Vega 95.3

People
 Vega (singer) (born 1979), born Mercedes Mígel Carpio, Spanish singer/songwriter
 Vega Jurij (born 1754), Slovene mathematician, physicist and artillery officer
 Vega Tamotia (born 1985), Indian actress
 Vega (surname), a list of people with the name Vega

Schools
 Vega (South Africa), a private university in South Africa
 Vega High School, Vega, Texas, U.S.
 Vega Schools, Gurgaon, Haryana state, India

Science, technology and medicine
 Vega, the GPU architecture from Vivante Corporation
 AMD Vega, the GPU architecture featured in the Radeon RX Vega line of GPUs
 Radeon RX Vega series, graphics processors developed by AMD
 Vega machine, an electrodiagnostic device
 Vertebrate and Genome Annotation Project (VEGA), a biological database
 Vega and Vega-Lite visualisation grammars, visualization tools implementing a grammar of graphics in JavaScript

Ships
 HMS Vega, several ships of the British Royal Navy
 MS Vega, now MS Mytilene, a Greek ferry ship
 SS Vega, various steamships
 USS Vega, several ships of the United States Navy
 Vega, a Finnish schooner; see Finnish war reparations to the Soviet Union

Other uses
 Vega (grape), a white Italian wine grape
 Vega, or grass valley, a meadow located within a forested and relatively small drainage basin
 Vega, in finance a measure of sensitivity to volatility; see Greeks (finance)
 Chevrolet Vega, an American subcompact automobile produced in the 1970s
 Ford Vega, a concept car
 Facel Vega, a French performance luxury car produced in the 1950s
 Vega Medal, awarded by the Swedish Society for Anthropology and Geography

See also
 
 Bega (disambiguation)
 De la Vega (disambiguation)
 Vegan (disambiguation)
 Vegas (disambiguation)
 Viga (disambiguation)
 WEGA, a radio company, acquired by Sony in 1975